64th parallel may refer to:

64th parallel north, a circle of latitude in the Northern Hemisphere
64th parallel south, a circle of latitude in the Southern Hemisphere